Meinertzhagen may refer to:

People
 Annie Meinertzhagen (1889–1928), British ornithologist
 Ian Meinertzhagen (born 1944), Canadian neurobiologist
 Louis Meinertzhagen (1887–1941), British philatelist
 Richard Meinertzhagen (1878–1967), British Army officer and ornithologist

Places
  Meinerzhagen, town in the Märkischer Kreis, North Rhine-Westphalia (Germany)